Holthausen may refer to the following places in Germany:

in Lower Saxony

Lingen-Holthausen, a quarter of Lingen
Meppen-Holthausen, a quarter of Meppen (Germany)

in North Rhine-Westphalia

Dortmund-Holthausen, a locality of Dortmund, district-free city of the Ruhr area
Düsseldorf-Holthausen, a locality of Düsseldorf, district-free city of the Rhein-Ruhr-Gebiet
Hagen-Holthausen, a locality of Hagen district free city 
Hattingen-Holthausen, a locality of Hattingen
Herne-Holthausen, a locality of Herne, Germany
Laer-Holthausen, a locality of Laer, in the district of Steinfurt
Mülheim-Holthausen, a locality of Mülheim an der Ruhr district free city in the Ruhr area
Plettenberg-Holthausen, a locality of Plettenberg 
Schmallenberg-Holthausen, a locality in Schmallenberg

People
Ferdinand Holthausen (1860–1956), German scholar of the English and old Germanic languages
 Mike Holt, South African boxer of the 1950s and '60s (birth name Antione Michael Holthausen)